Chevireddy Bhaskar Reddy is a member of the Legislative Assembly of Andhra Pradesh, representing the Chandragiri (Assembly constituency) in the Tirupati district.

He was first elected in 2014 as a member of the legislative Assembly (MLA) through YSR Congress and the second time he was re-elected in 2019 as a Member of the Legislative Assembly (MLA) through YSR Congress Party.

Personal life

Chevireddy Bhaskar Reddy hails from Thummalagunta village near Tirupati. He attended school and college in Tirupati.

He has a Bachelor of Arts (BA), Bachelor of Law (BL) and completed his PhD in Development of Andhrapradesh : Contribution of Sri.YS Rajasekhar Reddy YSR from SV University.

Political career

He worked as student leader in SV university under NSUI.
He became a ZPTC (Zilla Parishad Member) at age 27 with the blessings of  YS Rajasekhar Reddy, serving as a member for 5 years. In 2007 he became TUDA chairman  and in 2014 was elected as MLA from Chandragiri constituency.

References

Living people
YSR Congress Party politicians
Telugu politicians
1973 births
Andhra Pradesh MLAs 2019–2024